Rinse 03 is a DJ mix compilation album by Supa D, as part of the Rinse Mix Albums.

Track listing

	Perempay & Dee	Buss It	
	Naughty Feat. Addictive 	Girl Like Me	
	Delio D'Cruze Feat. Kcat	Get Off The Wall	
	V Man & Daniel Sea	Sweet Blue	
	Naughty	Quick Time	
	DJ NG Feat. Katy B	Tell Me	
	Geeneus	Yellowtail	
	Tadow 	Risingsun	
	Fingerprint Feat. Courtney	Signed & Sealed	
	Jelly Jams Feat. Nikki	Emotions (VIP)	
	Tadow 	The Matrix	
	Matic Productions Feat Addictive 	Pain	
	Donaeo	Devil In A Blue Dress (Instrumental)	
	Footloose  Feat. Simone	Just Leave	
	Fingerprint	So Hot	
	Fuzzy Logic	What Goes Around	
	Apple 	Appletiser	
	Jelly Jams Feat. Katy B	I Try	
	Matic Productions	The Anthem	
	MA1 Feat. Sophia	I'm Right Here (DJ Naughty Remix)
	Funky Junkies	Mind, Body & Soul	
	Benga & Coki	Night (Geeneus Remix)
	Apple 	De Siegalizer (VIP)

References

2008 compilation albums
DJ mix albums